Fabián Alberto Frías (born 5 March 1971) is an Argentine football manager and former player who played as a goalkeeper. He is the current manager of Ecuadorian club Manta.

Career
Born in Buenos Aires, Frías represented Colegiales, Excursionistas, Chacarita Juniors, Platense and Central Ballester. He retired at the age of 29, and started working as a fitness coach at Platense, Atlanta, All Boys, Deportivo Morón, River Plate and Sportivo Italiano.

In 2011, Frías moved to Peru and joined Guillermo Rivarola's staff at Sporting Cristal, as his assistant. He was also Rivarola's assistant at Deportivo Cuenca in 2013, and was named manager in April of that year after Rivarola left.

Frías left Cuenca in December 2013, and was named in charge of former club Excursionistas back in his home country on 23 December 2014. He resigned from the latter club the following 7 May, and returned to Ecuador on 20 January 2016 after being named manager of Gualaceo.

On 8 December 2016, after narrowly missing out promotion, Farías took over fellow Serie B team Colón de Manabí. He left the club in June, and returned to Gualaceo in the following month.

Frías resigned from Gualaceo on 24 April 2018, and was appointed Técnico Universitario manager on 24 July. He was dismissed on 30 April 2019, and was named in charge of Atlético Porteño on 27 May.

Frías left Porteño on 30 August 2019, and was appointed manager of Manta. He helped the club in their promotion to the Serie A in 2020, after finishing second.

References

External links

1971 births
Living people
Footballers from Buenos Aires
Argentine footballers
Club Atlético Colegiales (Argentina) players
CA Excursionistas players
Chacarita Juniors footballers
Club Atlético Platense footballers
Central Ballester players
Argentine football managers
C.D. Cuenca managers
Manta F.C. managers
Argentine expatriate football managers
Argentine expatriate sportspeople in Peru
Argentine expatriate sportspeople in Ecuador
Expatriate football managers in Ecuador
Association footballers not categorized by position
Association football goalkeepers